Theresa Bäuml (born  in Koblenz, Germany), is a German Women's International motorcycle trials rider. She was the 2015 German Women's and  FIM European Women's Trials Champion. In 2016 Bäuml retained her European title.

Biography
Theresa Bäuml first rode trials on the international scene in 2010 at the Czech World Trials round. She returned there again in 2011 and scored her first international points with a 15th-place finish, ending the season 22nd in the FIM World Women's Trials Championship.

In 2012 Bäuml finished runner-up to Ina Wilde in the German Women's Championship. She was again runner-up to Wilde in 2013, finishing the season strongly with her first national win at the final Kiefersfelden round. On the international circuit Bäuml ended the season a creditable 2nd place in the European championship behind British rider Emma Bristow.

A strong start to 2014 saw Bäuml win the opening three rounds of the German series, but was knocked back to 2nd place later in the season, finished runner-up once again to Ina Wilde. They carried their rivalry over to the European Championships, with Bäuml taking a pair of wins in Poland, but Wilde managed to ahead on points for a repeat of their familiar one-two finish.

In 2015 Bäuml had her best season to date, turning the tables on Wilde and finally taking the top step of the podium at the end of the season. Winning her first German Women's Trials Title ahead of Wilde with Bianca Huber in 3rd place. She also stood on the podium alongside Wilde and Mona Pekarek as a member of the German Women's Trial Des Nations Team that finished runner up to the British team in the Czech Republic. But the icing on the cake was winning the European Women's Championship after taking 2nd place in Italy and winning both rounds in Poland.

National Trials Championship Career

Women's European Trials Championship

Women's World Trials Championship

Honors
 German Women's Trials Champion 2015, 2016, 2017
 European Women's Trials Champion 2015, 2016

Related Reading
FIM Trial European Championship
FIM Trial World Championship

References

External links
 http://www.theresabaeuml.de/ Theresa Bäuml Official Website

1997 births
Living people
Sportspeople from Koblenz
German motorcycle racers
Motorcycle trials riders
Female motorcycle racers
German sportswomen